Jackpot Airport , also known as Hayden Field, is a county-owned, public-use airport located east of Jackpot, in Elko County, Nevada, United States. The National Plan of Integrated Airport Systems for 2011–2015 categorized it as a general aviation facility.

Facilities and aircraft 
The facility covers an area of 325 acres (132 ha) at an elevation of 5,224 feet (1,592 m) above mean sea level. It has one runway designated 15/33 with an asphalt surface measuring 6,183 by 60 feet (1,885 x 18 m).

For the 12-month period ending June 30, 2012, the airport had 5,500 general aviation aircraft operations, an average of 15 per day. At that time there was one jet aircraft based at this airport.

References

External links 
  from Nevada DOT
 Aerial image as of August 1994 from USGS The National Map
 

Airports in Nevada
Transportation in Elko County, Nevada
Buildings and structures in Elko County, Nevada